The Deanwood–Alabama Avenue Line, designated Route W4, is a daily bus route operated by the Washington Metropolitan Area Transit Authority between Deanwood station of the Orange Line of the Washington Metro and Anacostia station of the Green Line of the Washington Metro. The line operates every 12 minutes daily between 7:00 AM to 9:00 PM and 30 minutes other times. Route W4 trips are roughly 60 minutes long.

Background
Route W4 operates daily between Deanwood station and Anacostia station mostly operating between Northeast and Southeast. The line mostly runs along Division Avenue NE, Benning Road SE, Southern Avenue, and Alabama Avenue SE connecting multiple neighborhoods. Additional trips from Ballou High School are operated during school days in both directions. Select trips also end at Malcolm X Avenue & Newcomb Street SE, though passengers can remain on the bus as far as Malcolm X Avenue & South Capitol Street.

Route W4 currently operates out of Southern Avenue and Shepherd Parkway divisions. During the weekday peak-hours, the line utilizes articulated buses due to its high ridership volume from Shepherd Parkway. Route W4 used to operate out of Bladensburg until Shepherd Parkway received articulated buses.

History
The line originally operated on portions of former streetcars lines before becoming taken over buses in the 1950s to 1960s.

Route W4 originally operated under the Capital Traction Company under streetcars lines and later became a bus line on December 23, 1924. The line then was operated under DC Transit and then WMATA when it acquired DC Transit in 1973.

Route W4 originally operated between Capital Plaza Mall in Landover Hills, Maryland and Bolling Air Force Base via Craftsman Circle and Prince George's Plaza Hospital. The line mostly operated along Division Avenue NE, Benning Road SE, Alabama Avenue SE, Kenilworth Avenue, and Baltimore–Washington Parkway. Off peak service would terminate along Kenilworth Avenue.

On December 3, 1978, route W4 was rerouted to Deanwood station via Minnesota Avenue in the middle of its route shortly after the Orange Line began service. The line would terminate at Deanwood station during the off peak-hours and would serve Capital Plaza during the weekday peak-hours only.

On January 13, 2001, route W4 was rerouted along Alabama Avenue to serve the new Congress Heights station. Alternative service to 11th Place and Congress Street is available on the W2 and W3.

Due to security concerns at Bolling Air Force Base, route W4 could not enter the base beginning on March 21, 2003. The route would have to be rerouted South Capitol Street between Firth Sterling Avenue and Malcolm X Avenue. Passengers will be able to alight at stops on South Capitol Street at the Navy′s Firth Sterling Gate, walk through the security checkpoint, and access an internal military shuttle bus which will follow the W9 routing around the base to reach destinations within Bolling Air Force Base and the Navy′s Anacostia Annex.

On June 29, 2003, route W4 was rerouted from Bolling Air Force Base to Anacostia station as a result of the detour.

In 2011, WMATA proposed to eliminate route W4's routing between Deanwood station and Capital Plaza Mall. This was because route W4 was suffering from low ridership with large Portion of the Line in Maryland runs on Congested Roadways, impacting on-time performances with extended run times in Maryland that creates scheduling inflexibility in DC, where overwhelming majority of boardings occur. It was also proposed to improve the frequency of buses during all hours of the day.

It was proposed to extend either routes F1, F2, or F13 from Prince George's Hospital to Deanwood station discontinuing service to Cheverly station.

On March 24, 2013, W4 service between Deanwood station and Capital Plaza Mall via Craftsman Circle and Prince George's Hospital was discontinued due to low ridership and to improve on time performance. Alternative service was provided by routes A12, routes F1, F2, F8, F13, R11, R12, V7, V8, V14, and V15. There was no alternative service to Craftmans Circle however.

In 2019 as part of WMATA's FY2021 budget, it was proposed to reroute the W4 to Fort Drum and D.C. Village in order to discontinue the A4 and W5, Service to Anacostia station would be discontinued with alternative service will be provided on routes A2, A6, A7, A8, A9, and W2. Fort Drum and DC Village residents would lose direct service to Anacostia station if the proposal goes through. However WMATA later backed out the proposal on March 31, 2020.

During the COVID-19 pandemic, Route W4 was reduced to operate on its Saturday supplemental schedule during the weekdays beginning on March 16, 2020. On March 18, 2020, the line was further reduced to operate on its Sunday schedule. Weekend service was later further reduce to operate every 30 minutes on March 21, 2020. Regular service was restored on August 23, 2020.

In February 2021 during the FY2022 budget, WMATA brought back the W4 reroute to Fort Drum and D.C. Village to replace the A4 and W5 if WMATA does not get federal funding. However, the terminus would be changed to terminate at Minnesota Avenue station instead of Deanwood station. Service to Deanwood would be replaced by a modified Route 96 while a modified A8 would replace service to Anacostia station.

On September 5, 2021, W4 service was also increased to operate every 12 minutes daily between 7 a.m. to 9 p.m.

Incidents
 On October 20, 2011, 22-year-old Demetrius Thompson was shot in the face by two men on board a W4 bus near the intersection of 24th Street and Alabama Avenue SE. Thompson was later transported to a local hospital and later died.
 On May 14, 2021, an SUV collided with a W4 bus on Southern Avenue near Alton Street injuring 4 people.
 On October 18, 2022, a 42-year old woman was attacked by school kids and pushed off from a W4 bus in Southeast. Two people were later arrested.

References

W4